Puerto Princesa, officially the City of Puerto Princesa (Cuyonon: Siyudad i'ang Puerto Princesa), is a 1st class highly urbanized city in the Mimaropa region of the Philippines. According to the 2020 census, it has a population of 307,079 people.

It is a city located in the western Philippine province of Palawan and is the westernmost city in the Philippines. Though the seat of government and capital for the province, the city itself is one of 38 independent cities within the Philippines not controlled by the province in which it is geographically located and is therefore an independent area located within Palawan.

It is the least densely populated city in the Philippines with 110 inhabitants per square kilometre (280/square mile). Puerto Princesa is the location of the Philippines' Western Command headquarters.

Today, Puerto Princesa is a tourist city with many beach resorts and seafood restaurants. It has been acclaimed several times as the cleanest and greenest city in the Philippines.

Etymology
The name Puerto Princesa have several origins. It is said to have been attributed by locals to a princess-like maiden who roam the place at certain nights of the year, while other accounts attributed its geographical advantage as a seaport which is a naturally protected area due to its surrounding mountains, and is characterized by a depth able to accommodate any size of shipping vessel.

Historically, this place was originally named Port Asuncion after Princess Asuncion, one of the princesses born to Isabella II of Spain and her consort, Francis, Duke of Cádiz. When the princess suffered an untimely death, the Queen changed the name to Puerto de la Princesa. Eventually, the name was shortened to Puerto Princesa.

History

Spanish period 

Spanish colonizers founded the settlement on March 4, 1872, in the course of their exploration of the province. As they scanned the Palawan shoreline for a capital site, they came upon a hill with steep declivity. Rowing to shore, they surveyed the hill and discovered an extensive plateau which they decided as ideal for settlement.

Soon after, Fr. Antonio Muro levelled a portion of the hill to make way for a chapel (that section is now occupied by the Roman Catholic Cathedral, the P.C. Barracks and the Rizal Park, the Old Municipal Building used to be there, as well as an Elementary School). The first mass celebrated in Puerto Princesa took place at a site where a marker now stands.

In May 1872, the Port of Puerto Princesa became the center of Spanish Naval Operations in the area because the Bay met all the Navy's requirements. Royal Decrees later provided incentives to settlers, and by 1883 the settlement had flourished into a town of twelve roads, a hospital and well-built port.

In 1894, Puerto Princesa was recognized by government authorities as one of the most beautiful towns in the country by virtue of the orderly distribution of streets, buildings and houses as well as the cleanliness of the community.

American period and World War II 

In 1911, the New American Administration made Puerto Princesa the seat of the Palawan Provincial Government with Major John Brown as Lieutenant Governor.

In the year 1936, Governor Heginio Mendoza made a directive on the transfer of the Palawan High School (currently Palawan National School) from the island municipality of Cuyo to the central place of the province, which was the Municipality of Puerto Princesa.

During WWII and the Japanese occupation, the village was largely abandoned. On May 18, 1942, Japanese troops landed and occupied Puerto Princesa City.

The Filipino Constabulary barracks was the scene of the Palawan Massacre, just before liberation with the allied Invasion of Palawan.

Post-World War II 
In 1951, the barrios of Tinitian, Caramay, Rizal, Del Pilar, Malcampo, Tumarbong, Taradungan, Ilian, and Capayas were separated to form the town of Roxas.

In 1955, the sitios of Materingen, Tandayag, Nasedoc, and Panlawagan were separated from the barrio of Maroyogon and elevated into a barrio.

In 1956, the sitios of Calagbenguen, Tarabanan, Bendoyan, Talabigan, Tagbuan, and Langogan were constituted into the barrio of Concepcion.

In 1957, the barrio of Tapul was renamed to Salvacion.

Cityhood

The town was converted into a city on January 1, 1970, under Republic Act 5906 as amended by P.D. 437, through the effort of then Congressman Ramon Mitra, Jr. Feliberto R. Oliveros, Jr., who then became the first City Mayor.

Highly urbanized city
On March 26, 2007, Proclamation No. 1264, converting the city of Puerto Princesa into a highly urbanized city, was signed by President Gloria Macapagal Arroyo. The plebiscite was held along with Lapu-Lapu City in Cebu on July 21, 2007. The majority of voters voted to accept the conversion into a HUC. Puerto Princesa became the 31st highly urbanized city in the Philippines. Meanwhile, the "Yes" votes won in Lapu-Lapu City, making the city as the 32nd highly urbanized city in the country.

Contemporary
In May 2001, Abu Sayyaf gunmen entered the luxury Dos Palmas Resort in Honda Bay just off the coast of Puerto Princesa and kidnapped 20 people from the resort, including four resort staff and three Americans.

Since its foundation, Puerto Princesa has been the nerve center of activities in Palawan. Aside from being the seat of public administration, it is the heart of trade, commerce, service, and industry in the province.

Geography
Puerto Princesa is located in the midsection of Palawan Island. It is bound to the east by the Sulu Sea, to the west iby the South China Sea, to the north by the municipalities of San Vicente and Roxas, and to the south by the municipality of Aborlan.

Barangays
Administratively and politically, Puerto Princesa is politically subdivided into 66 barangays or 1st to 2nd districts, 35 of which are classified as urban barangays and 31 as rural with population.

 Babuyan (Rural) 2,472
 Bacungan (Rural) 4,555
 Bagong Bayan (Rural) 827
 Bagong Pag-Asa (Urban) 750
 Bagong Sikat (Urban) 7,497
 Bagong Silang (Urban) 5,296
 Bahile (Rural) 2,339
 Bancao-bancao (Urban) 13,612
 Binduyan (Rural) 1,293
 Buenavista (Rural) 1,212
 Cabayugan (Rural) 3,368
 Concepcion (Rural) 1,418
 Inagawan (Rural) 1,623
 Inagawan Sub-Colony (Rural) 4,052
 Irawan (Urban) 6,142
 Iwahig (Rural) 4,527
 Kalipay (Urban) 725
 Kamuning (Rural) 1,978
 Langogan (Rural) 2,067
 Liwanag (Rural) 1,202
 Lucbuan (Rural) 1,401
 Luzviminda (Rural) 3,473
 Mabuhay (Urban) 206
 Macarascas (Rural) 1,609
 Magkakaibigan (Urban) 375
 Maligaya (Urban) 311
 Manalo (Urban) 2,143
 Mandaragat (Urban) 9,210
 Manggahan (Urban) 644
 Mangingisda (Rural) 5,350
 Maningning (Urban) 791
 Maoyon (Rural) 1,281
 Marufinas (Rural) 609
 Maruyogon (Rural) 1,450
 Masigla (Urban) 609
 Masikap (Urban) 958
 Masipag (Urban) 1,971
 Matahimik (Urban) 1,228
 Matiyaga (Urban) 413
 Maunlad (Urban) 3,865
 Milagrosa (Urban) 3,100
 Model (Urban) 327
 Montible (Rural) 362
 Napsan (Rural) 1,797
 New Panggangan (Rural) 629
 Pagkakaisa (Urban) 1,131
 Princesa (Urban) 1,015
 Salvacion (Rural) 1,197
 San Jose (Urban) 17,521
 San Manuel (Urban) 12,510
 San Miguel (Urban) 19,649
 San Pedro (Urban) 22,089
 San Rafael (Rural) 1,836
 Santa Cruz (Rural) 840
 Santa Lourdes (Urban) 5,171
 Santa Lucia (Rural) 147
 Santa Monica (Urban) 20,094
 San Isidro (Urban) 312
 Sicsican (Urban) 15,861
 Simpocan (Rural) 1,272
 Tagabinet (Rural) 1,170
 Tagburos (Urban) 7,045
 Tagumpay (Urban) 465
 Tanabag (Rural) 700
 Tanglaw (Urban) 1,739
 Tiniguiban (Urban) 12,285

Climate
Puerto Princesa features a tropical wet and dry climate (Köppen climate classification Aw). It is usually wet from May to December and with very little rain from January to April. It is warm and humid all year round.

Demographics

Waves of migrants from other Philippine provinces, and even other countries, have turned Puerto Princesa into a melting pot of various cultures. Among the original inhabitants are the Cuyonons who have a rich legacy of folklore and traditions. Indigenous groups include the Tagbanwas, Palawanos, Molbogs and Bataks, each group with its distinct culture and system of beliefs.

Total inhabitants number 307,079 (as of 2020), of which three-quarter of the population resides in the city proper, an urban settlement on the shores of Puerto Princesa Bay. Although the predominant language is Tagalog, Cuyonon is widely spoken and used throughout the whole city, as well as Hiligaynon, other Visayan languages, and English.

Economy

Puerto Princesa is known as the "Eco-Tourism Center of the Philippines". In recent years, the city has seen an increase in the number of tourists bringing with them trade and businesses for the city. Many hotels ranging from basic to five-star luxury accommodations have been developed since the 1990s to cater to a growing number of foreign and local tourists in the city.

There are also a number of restaurants, bars and shopping malls, including the Robinsons Place Palawan, NCCC Mall Palawan, Unitop Mall Puerto Princesa, as well as the recently opened SM City Puerto Princesa.

Some tourists who come to Puerto Princesa visit the Puerto Princesa Subterranean River National Park, one of the New7Wonders of Nature, located 50 km north of the city. The city is also the jump-off point for exploring the Tubbataha Reef.

Transportation

Air
The Puerto Princesa International Airport is within the city proper. Puerto Princesa is accessible by direct flights to and from the major cities of the Philippines, such as Manila, Cebu, Davao, Iloilo, and Clark, as well as other parts of Palawan, such as Cuyo, Busuanga, San Vicente, and El Nido.

Sea
The city is served by domestic passenger ferries to Cuyo, Manila, Coron and Iloilo at the Port of Puerto Princesa.

Land

The main modes of transport are via tricycles, jeepneys and vans-for-hire (or PUVs/public utility vehicles). Taxis started operating since April 2015, plying through the city center and nearby tourist destinations. Provincial buses and jeepneys operate from the San Jose terminal located 7 km north of the city center off the National Highway.

E-tricycle

Puerto Princesa then Mayor Edward S. Hagedorn unveiled the environment-friendly and economical electric-powered “Trikebayan” (which does not emit any noise or carbon monoxide) at the Kapihan sa Sulo forum, Sulo Hotel, Quezon City. The Trikebayan costs only  or $1.20 per day to operate, while a gasoline-powered tricycle operation would cost . Rolly Concepcion, who conceptualized the Trikebayan, said that converting a tricycle engine to electric costs . The rechargeable battery under the passenger seat can run for 12 hours. Mr. Conception died before the project was completed.

This did not discourage the previous mayor Hagedorn from pursuing a dream of seeing all electric vehicles, especially replacing the gas tricycles in the city. There was a dealership for these trikes on the north highway but it closed down in 2011.

Although Puerto Princesa has this bold plan for electric vehicles, the municipal government and tourist office has stated (when asked by a tourist in August 2011), that it has no published or announced plan for providing for the current and future needs and safety of pedestrians or bicycle riders. Spaces for walking and bicycling from one place to another are not being considered.

Healthcare
Hospitals in the city include:
MMG-PPC Cooperative Hospital
Ospital ng Palawan
Palawan Adventist Hospital
Palawan Medical City
PuertoGen Clinics & Infirmary
Ace Hospital

Government

Elected and appointed public officials have governed Puerto Princesa, with a strong mayor-council government. The city political government is composed of the mayor, vice mayor, ten councilors, one Sangguniang Kabataan (SK) Federation representative and an Association of Barangay Captains (ABC) representative. Each official is elected publicly to a three-year terms.

The following are the current city officials of Puerto Princesa:
House of Representatives Congressman: Edward S. Hagedorn (PDP-Laban)
Mayor: Lucilo R. Bayron (PDP-Laban)
Vice Mayor: Maria Nancy M. Socrates (Aksyon Demokratiko)
 Councilors: (PDP-Laban)
 Nesario G. Awat
 Judith M. Bayron
 Jimmy L. Carbonell
 Elgin Robert L. Damasco
 Herbert S. Dilig
 Henry A. Gadiano 
 Patrick Alex M. Hagedorn
 Luis M. Marcaida III
 Feliberto S. Oliveros III
 Modesto V. Rodriguez II
 Myka Mabelle L. Magbanua (Pres., SK Federation)

Media

Television networks
All of the major television broadcasting channels' regional offices are located in the city. ABS-CBN Corporation expanded its network in Palawan by establishing ABS-CBN Palawan, which operates ABS-CBN channel 7 Puerto Princesa, ABS-CBN Sports and Action Palawan DYAP-AM and MOR! Local shows such as TV Patrol Palawan are broadcast throughout the region via ABS-CBN Regional, which is also stationed in the city. Bandera News Philippines's airs shows via channel 40 Local Shows Such as Alerto 38, GMA Network's channel 12 and GMA News TV channel 27 are also available.

Cable and satellite TV
The city's cable and satellite TV companies include Puerto Princesa Cable Television (PPCATV)

Radio stations
Puerto Princesa has a number of FM and AM radio stations, some of which operate 24 hours daily.

Twin towns and sister cities

Local
 Quezon City, Metro Manila
 General Santos

International
 Haikou, Hainan, China
 Hsinchu, Taiwan, since February 10, 2006
 Maui County, Hawaii, USA, since March 5, 1999

Notable personalities

Daryl Ong – singer
Raul Mitra – composer
Ramon Mitra Jr. – former House Speaker
Abraham Kahlil Mitra – former Governor of Palawan and Games And Amusement Board Chairperson
Samantha Bernardo - Beauty pageant titlist (Miss Grand International 2020 - 1st Runner-up, Bb. Pilipinas Grand International 2020, Bb. Pilipinas 2018 and 2019 - 2nd Runner-up)

Notable organizations
 Centre for Sustainability PH, Inc.
 Palawan Centre for Sustainable Development
 Roots of Health

See also
Naval Base Puerto Princesa

References

External links

 [ Philippine Standard Geographic Code]
Official City Puerto Princesa website
Department of Tourism - Puerto Princesa

 
Populated places in Palawan
Cities in Mimaropa
Highly urbanized cities in the Philippines
Provincial capitals of the Philippines
Populated places established in 1872
1872 establishments in the Philippines
Port cities and towns in the Philippines